Antennatus tuberosus, known as the tuberculated frogfish, is a species of fish in the family Antennariidae. It is native to the Indo-Pacific, where it is found from East Africa east to the Philippines, Indonesia, and other islands on the Pacific Plate. It is a benthic reef-dwelling species found, on average, at a depth of around 11.2 m (37 ft), though it is often found in water shallower than that and occasionally much deeper, at up to 73 m (240 ft), and it is a small fish that can reach 9 cm (3.5 inches) SL. The species is known to be able to change color in the span of two weeks, with individuals shifting from dark gray to light cream to match the experimental aquaria they are kept in. It is oviparous and its eggs are bound in ribbon-like sheaths or large "rafts" or "veils". Like most frogfish, it is reclusive and solitary, sometimes being seen among hard coral branches.

References 

Antennariidae
Taxa named by Georges Cuvier
Fish described in 1817